Nedrevaag Island is one of the Rønnbeck Islands in the Svalbard archipelago. It lies in Hinlopen Strait northeast of Cape Weyprecht on Spitsbergen. The wildlife consists largely of polar bears.

The island was discovered in 1867 by the Swedish-Norwegian polar explorer Nils Fredrik Rønnbeck. It is named after A. O. Nedrevaag, a Norwegian skipper that carried out geographical and meteorological observations in 1870 for the Kara Sea and Novaya Zemlya while on board the Johanne Marie.

References

Islands of Svalbard
Seal hunting